Ro Hak-su (born 19 January 1990) is a North Korean international football player.

Goals for Senior National Team

References

1990 births
Living people
North Korean footballers
North Korea international footballers
2015 AFC Asian Cup players
Association football defenders